The 1998 AT&T Challenge was a men's tennis tournament played on Clay in Atlanta, Georgia, United States that was part of the World Series of the 1998 ATP Tour. It was the thirteenth edition of the tournament and was held from April 27 through May 3, 1998. First-seeded Pete Sampras won the singles title.

Finals

Singles

 Pete Sampras defeated  Jason Stoltenberg, 6–7(2–7), 6–3, 7–6(7–4)
 It was Sampras' 2nd singles title of the year and the 54th of his career.

Doubles

 Ellis Ferreira /  Brent Haygarth defeated  Alex O'Brien /  Richey Reneberg, 6–3, 0–6, 6–2

References

External links
 ITF tournament edition details

ATandT Challenge
Verizon Tennis Challenge
ATandT Challenge